La Lionetta is an acoustic band of Turin, Piedmont. The group was started in 1977 as a folk group. After the two first LPs, "Danze e ballate dell'area celtica italiana" and "Il gioco del Diavolo", La Lionetta played in the Principal Folk Festival in Europe (Nyon, Salzburg, Murienne...)

The group broke up in 1987. After a long period the group has a new life with two of the old components and new friends. Now, the sound is more influenced by Arabian and Balcanic music and the songs are written by the band.

External links
English website
Italian website

Italian musical groups
Musical groups established in 1977
Musicians from Turin